The 1948 National League Division One was the 14th season of speedway in the United Kingdom and the third post-war season of the highest tier of motorcycle speedway in Great Britain.

Summary
The entrant list was the same as the previous season. New Cross Rangers won the National League for the second time.

Fatalities
1948 proved to be the worst season so far in regard to fatalities. During the 1947 season two riders had died on the same day but 1948 saw three riders killed during the season. It started with 37-year-old Reg Craven, on his debut for Yarmouth Bloaters. Craven crashed with two Poole Pirates riders at Poole (on 26 April) during a National Trophy match and died eight days later (4 May) from a fractured skull in hospital. Billy Wilson of Norwich Stars and Eric Dunn of Hastings Saxons from the lower divisions were also killed.

Final League table

National League results

Matches 1–12
Teams play each other twice, once at home and once away.

Matches 13–24
Teams play each other twice, once at home and once away.

Anniversary Cup table
On account of the small number of teams in the league the Anniversary Cup was run in a league format. Harringay Racers finished on top.

Anniversary Cup results

Matches 1–12
Teams play each other twice, once at home and once away.

Top Ten Riders (League only)

National Trophy
The 1948 Trophy was the 11th edition of the Knockout Cup.

Qualifiying Competition Round 1

Qualifiying Competition Round 1

Qualifiying Competition semifinal

Qualifiying Competition final

Eliminating Competition First round

Eliminating Competition Second round

Eliminating Competition semifinal

Eliminating Competition final

First round

Quarterfinals

Semifinals

Final

First leg

Second leg

Wembley were National Trophy Champions, winning on aggregate 120–96.

See also
 List of United Kingdom Speedway League Champions
 Knockout Cup (speedway)

References

Speedway National League
1948 in speedway
1948 in British motorsport